The Georgetown University College of Arts & Sciences (CAS) is the oldest school within Georgetown University in Washington, D.C. The College is the largest undergraduate school at Georgetown, and until the founding of the School of Medicine in 1850, was the only higher education division of the university. In 1821, the school granted its first graduate degrees, though the graduate portion has since been separated as the Georgetown University Graduate School of Arts and Sciences. From 1990 to 2022, it was named Georgetown College.

The current dean of the college is Rosario Ceballo, who assumed the position in 2022. Alone, the college accounts for over 3,500 students, 30 academic majors with 23 departments. This forms the core of the undergraduate population.

History

From 1789 until the founding of the School of Medicine in 1850, Georgetown College was the only secondary school at what became Georgetown University. Robert Plunkett, the first president of Georgetown, oversaw the division of the school into three parts, "college", "preparatory", and "elementary". Elementary education was eventually dropped by Patrick Francis Healy, and preparatory eventually separated as Georgetown Prep.

Over the years many schools have broken off of the College. The Graduate School of Arts and Sciences first broke off in 1855, but rejoined the college organization following the downturn in admissions caused by the American Civil War, until reestablishment in 1891. The School of Languages and Linguistics, itself organized out of the School of Foreign Service in 1949, was collapsed into the College in 1995, as the Faculty of Languages and Linguistics, though it maintains its separate programs.

Degrees

Bachelor of Arts

 African-American Studies

 American Studies
 Anthropology
 Arabic
 Art and Art history
 Chinese
 Classics
 Comparative Literature
 Computer Science
 Economics
 English
 French
 German
 Government
 History
 Interdisciplinary Studies
 Italian
 Japanese
 Justice and Peace Studies
 Linguistics
 Mathematics
 Medieval Studies
 Performing Arts
 Philosophy
 Physics
 Political Economy
 Portuguese
 Psychology
 Russian
 Sociology
 Spanish
 Theology

Bachelor of Science

 Biology
 Biochemistry
 Chemistry
 Computer Science
 Mathematics
 Physics
 Biological Physics

List of deans and prefects of studies 
From 1811 to 1931, Georgetown College was led by a prefect of studies. Since 1931, it has been led by a dean. The following people have led the college:

References

Citations

Sources 
 
 
 

College
Educational institutions established in 1789
Liberal arts colleges at universities in the United States
1789 establishments in Maryland